Frickleton is a surname. Notable people with the surname include:

Joe Frickleton (1935–2020), Scottish football player and manager
Samuel Frickleton (1891–1971), New Zealand Army officer